The P.W. & B. Railroad Bridge was the first bridge over the Susquehanna River, built by the Philadelphia, Wilmington and Baltimore Railroad in 1866, as part of the first mainline railroad between Philadelphia and Baltimore. The bridge was replaced by the Susquehanna River Movable Bridge (now called the Amtrak Susquehanna River Bridge) in 1906.

History

The P.W. & B. began operating its main line in 1838, using a ferry operation to transport railroad cars over the Susquehanna River.

Construction of the bridge, which was a wood truss design, began in 1862. The masonry and most of the wooden spans were complete in 1866, but then a tornado severely damaged the wooden components on July 25, 1866. Repairs were quickly made and the first locomotive crossed the bridge on November 20, 1866. The cost of construction, including rebuilding most of the truss portions, was $2.3 million. Passenger trains began service over the bridge on November 26, 1866.

The P.W. & B. later replaced the wooden spans with iron spans. A draw span was then installed in the late 1870s.

The Pennsylvania Railroad took control of the P.W. & B. in 1881. It built a new bridge from 1904 to 1906.

The P.W. & B. bridge was then converted to a vehicular bridge and was made double-decker because it was so narrow.  Its existence as such overlapped that of what is now the Hatem Bridge but was eventually dismantled during World War II.  The piers still stand next to the current railroad bridge today.

References

External links
 

Bridges over the Susquehanna River
Buildings and structures in Havre de Grace, Maryland
Philadelphia, Baltimore and Washington Railroad
Pennsylvania Railroad bridges
Railroad bridges in Maryland
Bridges in Harford County, Maryland
Truss bridges in the United States
Wooden bridges in the United States
Iron bridges in the United States
Bridges completed in 1866
1866 establishments in Maryland
1940 disestablishments in Maryland
Railroad Bridge